M. rosacea  may refer to:
 Mitra rosacea, a sea snail species
 Mitrella rosacea, a sea snail species
 Mycteroperca rosacea, a grouper fish species from the Eastern Central Pacific

See also
 Rosacea (disambiguation)